Strogov is a surname. Notable people with the surname include:

 Leelila Strogov, American news reporter
 Yuliyan Strogov (born 1972), Bulgarian boxer